Charles Henry Schwanfelder (1774–1837) was an English animal, landscape and portrait painter.

Schwanfelder was born and died in Leeds. He was the son of a German decorative painter and started out helping his father to paint clock faces and snuff boxes. He was renowned for his animal paintings and was appointed animal painter to George III and George IV.

He exhibited at the Royal Academy between 1809 and 1814

His bust was carved by Joseph Theakston and exhibited in the Royal Academy in 1818,

References

External links

  18thc English art
  18thc English painting
  Schwanfelder for sale
  Schwanfelder at Leeds
  Schwanfelder for sale online

18th-century English painters
English male painters
19th-century English painters
Landscape artists
Animal artists
English portrait painters
English people of German descent
1774 births
1837 deaths
19th-century English male artists
18th-century English male artists